Dorian Gray is a 2009 British dark fantasy horror film based on Oscar Wilde's 1890 novel The Picture of Dorian Gray,  directed by Oliver Parker, and written by Toby Finlay (his first screenplay). The film stars Ben Barnes, Colin Firth, Rebecca Hall, Ben Chaplin, Emilia Fox, and Rachel Hurd-Wood. It tells the story of the title character, an attractive Englishman whose loveliness and spirit are captured in an enchanted painting that keeps him from aging. His portrait becomes further tainted with every sin he commits while he remains young and handsome.

Dorian Gray was released in the United Kingdom on 9 September 2009, by Momentum Pictures, having competed in the Official Fantàstic Competition at the 2009 Sitges Film Festival.

Plot
When a naive young Dorian Gray arrives in Victorian London to inherit an estate left to him by his abusive grandfather, he is swept into a social whirlwind by the charismatic Lord Henry "Harry" Wotton, who introduces Gray to the hedonistic pleasures of the city. Lord Henry's friend, society artist Basil Hallward, paints a portrait of Gray to capture his beauty. Gray makes a flippant pledge: he would give anything to stay as he is in the picture—even his soul.

Gray falls in love with budding young actress, Sibyl Vane, and proposes marriage. Lord Henry tells Gray that having children is "the beginning of the end", and after the two men visit a brothel, Gray leaves Sibyl. Heartbroken, the young woman commits suicide by drowning. Gray learns of her death from her brother, James ("Jim"), who reveals that Sybil was pregnant with Gray's child. Enraged, Jim tries to kill Gray before being carried off by the authorities. Gray's initial grief soon disappears as Lord Henry persuades him that all events are mere experiences and without consequence. His hedonistic lifestyle worsens, distancing him from a concerned Hallward.

Gray finds that Hallward's portrait of him has become warped and twisted and realises that his off-hand pledge has come true; while the portrait ages, its owner's sins manifest as physical defects on the canvas. This results in Hallward's brutal murder after the artist reveals his secret. Gray dismembers and dumps Hallward's body in the River Thames, but the remains are recovered and buried.

Gray decides to travel the world and invites Lord Henry, but he declines, citing his wife's pregnancy. After a 25-year absence, Gray stuns everyone at the welcoming party with his unchanged youthful appearance. He becomes close to Lord Henry's daughter, Emily, a member of the UK suffragette movement, much to her father's disapproval.

Although Gray appears interested in changing his ways for Emily, matters are complicated when he is confronted by Jim. Jim is killed by an oncoming train while pursuing Gray in the London Underground. As Gray makes arrangements to leave London with Emily, Lord Henry's suspicions are confirmed when a study of old photographs triggers a memory where Gray had suggested that he would exchange his soul in return for eternal youth and beauty.

Lord Henry discovers the concealed portrait and Basil's blood-stained scarf. Gray declares that he is the personification of the life Lord Henry had fantasised about. Gray attempts to strangle Lord Henry, but Lord Henry knocks him aside and exposes the portrait. Horrified at the twisted sight on the canvas, Lord Henry sets it alight and locks the attic to ensure that Gray and the painting are destroyed. Gray confesses his love for Emily and turns his back as Lord Henry drags his daughter out of the burning mansion. Resolving to end his suffering, Gray impales the painting with a poker, causing his body to age rapidly before the attic is consumed by an explosion.

A few months later, following a futile attempt to reconcile with Emily, Lord Henry, with his face partially burned, heads to his attic, where he keeps the portrait of Gray as it was when Hallward painted it, grimly noting that nobody will look at it now. The portrait's eyes glow, implying that Gray's restless essence still resides within the painting, even after the destruction of his physical self.

Cast

Supporting parts are played by Pip Torrens as Victor, Gray's valet; Jo Woodcock as Lord and Lady Radley's daughter Celia; Max Irons as Lucius, a young man whom Gray assaults at a party for touching the key to the attic door; David Sterne as the theatre manager who first introduces Gray to Sibyl; and Douglas Henshall as Alan Campbell, an acquaintance of Gray's who is present when Jim Vane tries to strangle Gray.

Production
The film began shooting in summer 2008 at Ealing Studios and locations across London and finished in October.  The film received £500,000 of National Lottery funding via the UK Film Council's Premiere Fund.

Reception

The film received mixed reviews. , the film holds an approval rating of 44% on film review aggregator website Rotten Tomatoes, based on 39 reviews with an average rating of 5/10. The site's critical consensus states: "Despite a lavish and polished production, Dorian Gray is tame and uninspired with a lifeless performance by Ben Barnes in the title role."

See also

 Adaptations of The Picture of Dorian Gray

References

External links

 
 
 
 

2009 films
2009 drama films
2009 horror films
2009 fantasy films
2009 LGBT-related films
2009 thriller films
British drama films
British fantasy drama films
British horror films
British thriller films
British LGBT-related films
Films based on The Picture of Dorian Gray
Films directed by Oliver Parker
Films set in 1891
Films set in 1916
Films set in London
Films shot in London
Gay-related films
LGBT-related drama films
LGBT-related thriller films
2000s English-language films
2000s British films